Colo Vale is a former railway station which was located on the Picton – Mittagong loop railway line. It served the small town of Colo Vale, a northern village of the Southern Highlands  of New South Wales, Australia.

History
The station opened on 1 May 1883 as Colemans Siding, and was renamed Colo Vale on 1 August 1885. The station along with the Loop Line was closed in 1978.

The station is located on a crossing loop. It has been restored by the Colo Vale Community Association.

References

External links 

Disused regional railway stations in New South Wales
Railway stations in Australia opened in 1883
Railway stations closed in 1978
Main Southern railway line, New South Wales